Lincoln Highway Bridge may refer to:

 Lincoln Highway Bridge (Dugway Proving Ground, Utah), a historic bridge on the proposed route for the Lincoln Highway in the United States, that is listed on the National Register of Historic Places (NRHP)
 Lincoln Highway Bridge (Tama, Iowa), a historic bridge the United States, that is listed on the NRHP
 Lincoln Highway Hackensack River Bridge, a bridge in Hudson County, New Jersey, United States
 Lincoln Highway Passaic River Bridge, a bridge in Hudson County, New Jersey, United States

See also
Lincoln Bridge (disambiguation)